The following rail lines have been owned or operated by the Denver and Rio Grande Western Railroad or its predecessors.

Denver-Pueblo Joint Line: Denver (Union Station) to Pueblo
Fort Logan Branch: Englewood (Military Junction) to Fort Logan
Lehigh Branch: Louviers (Lehigh Junction) to Lehigh Mine
Castle Rock Branch: Castle Rock to Hathaway
O'Brien's Quarry Spur: Hathaway to O'Brien's Quarry
Douglas Quarry Spur: Douglas to Madge Quarry
Manitou Branch: Colorado Springs (Manitou Junction) to Manitou

Royal Gorge Line: Pueblo to Salida via Royal Gorge
Coal Creek Branch: Florence to Coal Creek
Oak Creek Branch: Florence (Oak Creek Junction) to Oak Creek
Chandler Creek Branch: Chandler Junction to Chandler Mine
Fremont Branch: Fremont Junction to Fremont Mine
Grape Creek Branch: Cañon City (Grape Creek Junction) to Westcliffe
Westcliffe Branch: Texas Creek to Westcliffe
Howard Branch: Howard's Quarry Junction to Calcite

Tennessee Pass Line: Salida to Grand Junction via Tennessee Pass
Calumet Branch: Brown Canon (Hecla Junction) to Calumet
Leadville Branch: Malta to Leadville
California Gulch Branch: Oro Junction to Rowe Mill
Ibex Branch: Leadville to Ibex
Graham Park Branch: Graham Park Junction to Tucson
Blue River Branch: Leadville to Dillon
Ryan Cut-Off: Leadville Junction to Leadville (Leadville Branch)
Aspen Branch: Glenwood Springs to Aspen

Gunnison Line: Salida to Grand Junction via Marshall Pass and Black Canyon
Monarch Branch: Poncha Junction to Monarch
Mears Junction-Alamosa Line: Mears Junction to Alamosa
Orient Branch: Villa Grove to Orient
Crestone Branch: Moffat to Cottonwood
Pitkin Branch: Parlin to Quartz
Crested Butte Branch: Gunnison to Anthracite
Ruby-Anthracite Branch: Crested Butte to Floresta
Baldwin Branch: Gunnison to Baldwin
Kubler Branch: Castleton to Kubler
Aberdeen Branch: Gunnison (Aberdeen Junction) to Aberdeen Quarry
Lake City Branch: Sapinero to Lake City
Ouray Branch: Montrose to Ouray
North Fork Branch: Delta (North Fork Junction) to Oliver

Utah Division: Grand Junction to Ogden
Ballard and Thompson Railroad: Thompson to Sego
Cane Creek Branch: Brendel to Potash
Sunnyside Branch: Mounds to Sunnyside
Spring Canyon Branch: Helper (Spring Canyon Junction) to Mutual
Kenilworth Branch: Helper (Kenilworth Junction) to Kenilworth
Jennings and Potter's Quarry Branch: Kyune (Jennings Junction) to quarries
Pleasant Valley Branch: Colton to Clear Creek
Winter Quarters Spur: Scofield to Winter Quarters
Marysvale Branch: Thistle to Marysvale
San Pete Valley Branch: Ephraim to Nephi
Morrison Branch: Ephraim to Morrison
Castle Valley Branch: Salina to Nioche
Tintic Branch: Springville to Silver City
Goshen Valley Branch: Pearl to Dividend and Iron King
Mammoth Spur: Mammoth Junction to Mammoth Mill
Provo Canyon Branch: Provo to Heber City
Orem Branch: Provo (Provo Junction) to Orem
Bingham Branch: Midvale to Bingham
Garfield Beach Extension: Welby to Garfield
Dalton and Lark Spur: Dalton to Lark
Bingham Branch Extension: Loline Junction to Cuprum
Copper Belt Branch: Bingham (Copper Belt Junction) to Montana-Bingham
Copper Belt-Carr Fork Branch: Yampa Mine Connection to Yampa Mine
Little Cottonwood Branch: Midvale to Wasatch
Park City Branch: Roper Junction to Park City
Lake Park Branch: Farmington (Lake Park Junction) to Lake Park
Hooper Branch: Roy to Cox

Pueblo–Alamosa line: Pueblo to Alamosa
Old Main Line: Minnequa (Sonora Junction) to Trinidad; branch from Cuchara Junction to Walsenburg (Walsenburg Junction)
Rouse Branch: Rouse Junction to Rouse (later began at Mayne and then Monson on the C&S trackage rights)
Old Rouse Branch: Old Rouse Junction to Old Rouse Mines
Engleville Branch: Engleville Junction to Engleville
Zinc Smelter Spur: Minnequa (Zinc Junction) to Blende
Capers Branch: Mustang to Capers (including part of the Old Main Line near Capers)
Colorado and Southern Railway trackage rights: Walsenburg to Longsdale Junction
Reilly Canon Branch: Longsdale Junction to Boncarbo
Loma Branch: Walsenburg (Loma Junction) to Alamo
New Pacific Mine Spur: Pictou (New Pacific Junction) to New Pacific Mine
Reliance Branch: La Veta (Reliance Junction) to Ojo
Tropic Spur: La Veta (Tropic Junction) to Tropic
Creede Branch: Alamosa to Creede

Alamosa–Durango line (San Juan Extension): Alamosa to Durango
Santa Fe Branch: Antonito to Santa Fe
La Madera Branch: Taos Junction to La Madera
Chama Lumber Spur: Chama (Biggs Junction) to Tierra Amarilla
Pagosa Springs Branch: Gato (Pagosa Junction) to Pagosa Springs
Rio Grande and Southwestern Railroad: Lumberton to Gallinas
Farmington Branch: Carbon Junction to Farmington
Silverton Branch: Durango to Silverton

Moffat Line: Denver (Union Station) to Dotsero (Tennessee Pass Line) via Moffat Tunnel
Corona Line: Newcomb to Vasquez (old line over Corona Pass; abandoned when Moffat Tunnel opened)
Craig Branch: Bond (Orestod) to Craig
Energy Spur: Hitchens to Energy

Rio Grande Southern Railroad: Ridgway (Ouray Branch) to Durango
Telluride Branch: Vance Junction to Pandora

References
D&RGW track profiles: 1923, 1934, and 1969

 Lines